Paulo Modesto da Silva Júnior (born 7 January 1993), commonly known as Paulinho, is a Brazilian footballer who plays for Atlético Mineiro as a defensive midfielder.

Career statistics
(Correct )

See also
Football in Brazil
List of football clubs in Brazil

References

External links
Atlético Mineiro profile 

1993 births
Living people
Footballers from Belo Horizonte
Brazilian footballers
Association football midfielders
Campeonato Brasileiro Série A players
Clube Atlético Mineiro players